Lyrup is a town in South Australia's rural Riverland area. Lyrup is located on the banks of the Murray River.   It is 267 kilometres north-east of Adelaide, the capital of the state of South Australia and 25 kilometres from Renmark.  At the 2006 census, Lyrup had a population of 502.

Lyrup is accessible by ferry. It was established in 1894 by the South Australian government as a part of the creation of a communal land system (one of twelve settlements). 243 people originally settled in Lyrup. The town was gazetted on 24 September 1896 and was named after "Lyrup's Hut", a boundary rider's shack.

Lyrup still maintains a communal land system. It has a community club, general store and picnic areas. The area around it produces grapes, stone fruit, citrus, almonds, apricots and some corn.

Notes and references

See also
 Murray River Crossings

External links and references
Murray River Towns – Lyrup
Tidy Towns Report – Lyrup
Travelmate – Lyrup

Towns in South Australia
Populated places on the Murray River
Riverland